Schattenwelt is the third album by Swiss violinist Paul Giger recorded in 1992 and released on the ECM label.

Reception
The Allmusic review by Mark W. B. Allender awarded the album 4 stars calling it "A great recording for aficionados of the violin with a sophisticated ear".

Track listing
All compositions by Paul Giger
 "Bay" - 3:15 
 "Dancing with the Stars" - 5:46 
 "Crane" - 2:34 
 "Creating the Labyrinth" - 10:54 
 "Birth of the Bull" - 1:54 
 "Fourteen Virgins" - 5:43 
 "Death" - 1:37 
 "Dancing in The World of Shadows" - 6:24 
 "Bombay (Good Night)" - 16:01 
Recorded at Propstei St. Gerold, Austria in May 1992

Personnel
Paul Giger - violin

References

ECM New Series albums
Paul Giger albums
Albums produced by Manfred Eicher
1993 albums